The Best Singers, created and owned by FTV Rights B.V., is a reality television series that has been broadcast under various names in a number of European countries. The original format is produced in the Netherlands by FTV Productions B.V. and broadcast on NPO1 by public broadcaster AVROTROS (formerly AVRO and TROS. The two broadcasters merged in 2013). The series was originally called De beste zangers van Nederland (meaning The Best Singers of the Netherlands), now it is called Beste Zangers (Best Singers). The format has been applied under various names in various countries.

History
After its highly successful launch in the Netherlands in 2009, Sweden launched its Swedish series starting 2010 called Så mycket bättre (meaning So Much Better). In Denmark the show is called Toppen af Poppen (meaning Top of the pops), airing two seasons the first year. Norway has started its own show in 2012 as Hver gang vi møtes (meaning Every Time We Meet). The Finnish series was launched also in 2012 under the title Vain elämää (meaning Just Life). Ever since the show has been licensed in France (on TF1, where it is called Stars au grand air), China (on CCTV), Estonia (Laula mu laulu, meaning Sing my song) and most recently it launched very successfully in Germany (Sing meinen Song - Das Tauschkonzert) on VOX. The Spanish adaptation, titled A mi manera (meaning My way), premiered in 2016 on laSexta. In 2020 the series started its local version in Switzerland. 

Similar shows are planned in Australia, Brazil, Italy and Russia, the United Kingdom and the United States.

Format
In each episode in any give series, a number of well-known local performers would be picked (varying between 6 and 8 each season) and in each episode, one singer would be centrally focused as the remaining artists sing songs by that specific artist or other songs that are meaningful to that artist. The original artist reflects on the "adaptions" (NOT "covers") of his/her songs done by the other participants. The final episode is usually consecrated to duets and a revisit to favorite performances during the season.

International versions

References

Reality television series franchises